Hotemaže is a village in the Municipality of Šenčur in the Upper Carniola region of Slovenia.

The church in the village is dedicated to Saint Ulrich. It is a single-aisle church with a gothic sanctuary built around 1470. Its highly ornamental altar dates to 1701.

References

External links 
Hotemaže at Geopedia

Populated places in the Municipality of Šenčur